L'ambizione delusa may refer to:

L'ambizione delusa, an adaptation of La commedia in commedia set by Rinaldo di Capua to a text by Giovanni Barlocci in 1738 
L'ambizione delusa, opera from List of operas by Galuppi  1741
L'ambizione delusa (Leo), opera by Leonardo Leo 1742
L'ambizione delusa, intermezzo by Marcello Bernardini  1779, Rome  
L'ambizione delusa, opera from List of operas by Pacini
L'ambizione delusa, intermezzo 2 acts from List of operas by Sarti   1779